Sporleder is a surname. Notable people with the name include:

 Gregory Sporleder (born 1964), American actor and filmmaker
 Pedro Sporleder (born 1971), Argentine rugby union footballer
 René Sporleder (born 1969), German judoka

Surnames of German origin